This is the complete list of Pan American Games medalists in fencing from 1951 to 2019.

Men's events

Individual épée

Team épée

Individual foil

Team foil

Individual sabre

Team sabre

Women's events

Individual épée

Team épée

Individual foil

Team foil

Individual sabre

Team sabre

References

External links
Fencing results from Columbia University website

Fencing